Kʼan I (also known as Ruler II, Lord Jaguar and Antenna Top I) was a Maya king of Caracol in Belize. He reigned AD 531-534.

Biography
Kʼan was a son of the king Yajaw Teʼ Kʼinich I, who was maybe a son of Kʼahkʼ Ujol Kʼinich I and Lady of Xultun.

His monuments are Stela 16 and Altar 14.

Because it was carved in slate rather than limestone, Stela 15 survives only in fragments, but it seems to record this ruler's accession and states that it took place under the auspices of a higher authority; because so little of the text can be read, it is not known whether this was a superordinate political power or a god. The inscription also mentions an attack against Oxwitzaʼ ("Three Hill Water"), as Caracol was anciently known, and refers to lords from Caracol and Tikal; it is by no means certain, however, that these events happened during the reign of Kʼan.

His wife was Lady Kʼal Kʼinich, who bore him Yajaw Teʼ Kʼinich II, his successor. His son was King Knot Ajaw.

References

Bibliography
Chronicle of the Maya Kings and Queens by Simon Martin and Nikolai Grube

Kings of Caracol
6th century in the Maya civilization
6th-century monarchs in North America